Ayyappa Masagi is an Indian engineer who founded the Water Literacy Foundation. His is known Water Magician, Water Gandhi, and Water Doctor due to his non-profit work. WLF focuses on water conservation projects across India, providing a wide range of solutions to India's water scarcity problem.

Personal life

Ayyappa Masagi was born in the small village of Gadag-Betageri, Karnataka. In his childhood he faced acute water shortage as he had to walk for hours with his mother to fetch water from the nearest stream bed. His passion for water conservation started because of this and grew as he gained relevant knowledge from his parents as well as research about water and agriculture. After graduating he worked for Larsen & Toubro for 23 years as a mechanical engineer. Wanting to pursue his passion for helping India's growing water scarcity issue, he quit his job and founded the Water Literacy Foundation. Their mission is "to establish a balance between water usage and water replenishment by means of bringing basic knowledge of water conservation practices that inspire and inculcate a culture of water efficiency."

Published work

Masagi authored Bhageeratha: War on Water Crisis, Converting Dry Land into Wet Land, where he discusses his own life experiences with water issues and project work with the Water Literacy Foundation. The book also explains different techniques to save and recharge our water.

References

Living people
Year of birth missing (living people)
Indian humanitarians